Rebecca Gallantree (born 19 August 1984 in Chelmsford, Essex) is a British diver. At the 2012 Summer Olympics, she competed in the Women's synchronized 3 metre springboard.  With Alicia Blagg, she won gold at the 2014 Commonwealth Games in the women's 3 m synchronised springboard. Rebecca graduated from the University of Leeds in 2005.

References

British female divers
Living people
Olympic divers of Great Britain
Divers at the 2008 Summer Olympics
Divers at the 2012 Summer Olympics
Divers at the 2016 Summer Olympics
1984 births
Sportspeople from Chelmsford
Divers at the 2014 Commonwealth Games
Commonwealth Games gold medallists for England
World Aquatics Championships medalists in diving
Commonwealth Games medallists in diving
Alumni of the University of Leeds
Medallists at the 2014 Commonwealth Games